Curious George Gets a Medal is a George book written and illustrated by Margret Rey and H. A. Rey and published by Houghton Mifflin in 1957. It is the fourth book in the original Curious George series, and tells the story of George's flight into space. The story was published only weeks before the Soviets launched Sputnik II and Rey wanted to share his interests in space travel with children.

Plot
Mr. Miller, the mailman, brings a letter for George. George cannot read the letter, so he tries to write one of his own.  He makes a mess with ink and a fountain pen and tries to wash it away with the garden hose, but the room fills with water (flooding the room) and he rushes to a nearby farm to get a portable pump and get rid of the flood with it. He is chased by the farmer but eludes him by hiding in a shirt on a clothes line and then jumping into a pickup truck headed for the museum (which turns out to be a science museum). George inadvertently makes another mess in the science museum with a dinosaur exhibit (with life-sized model/animatronic dinosaurs). The two dinosaurs are a mother Stegosaurus and a baby Stegosaurus. Then, he caught sight of a palm tree that had nut-like fruit growing on it (possibly coconuts) growing on it. George loves nuts. Suddenly, he is hungry because he has missed lunch. A family comes into the dinosaur exhibit to also see the dinosaurs. George (touching the dinosaur) uses himself as a model. The family (who saw George touching the dinosaur) thinks George is another stuffed animal (or model animal) by looking at his pose on the dinosaur. That is, or in other words: "they think it's a model monkey with a model dinosaur".

After the family leaves, this (although they are gone for some time) buys George some time to pick the "coconuts". So he happily attempts to pick them from the tree. He climbs onto the mother dinosaur's head and starts to pick them (though he forgets the nuts —like the rest of the displays in the other exhibits— are a model and not real). Thinking they are real, he pulls harder and harder, and then the tree begins to sway. Despite the nuts being picked becomes successful, the entire dinosaur exhibit along with George falls down.

The guards of the science museum become surprised and then they catch George as they find him underneath the fallen dinosaurs. The museum guards then report about the incident to the museum owner, Professor Wiseman. Angry and surprised, he proceeds that the museum guards (after they have caught George) should "lock the naughty monkey this instant and send him back to the zoo". The Man with the Yellow Hat stops the guards with the letter that Mr. Miller had brought. The letter says that Professor Wiseman wants him to go up in a space ship and then bail out. George agrees and is given a tiny space suit. At the critical moment, it is uncertain whether George will jump or not, but he does and the experiment is a success. George is carried to Earth by a parachute and is awarded a medal for him being the first space monkey.

See also
Ham, a chimpanzee who became the first great ape in space in a similar mission in January, 1961.
Project Excelsior, an Air Force program where Captain Joseph Kittinger made record-setting parachute jumps from a stratospheric balloon gondola in 1959–1960.
Project Manhigh, an Air Force program lifting human subjects into the stratosphere by balloon inside an enclosed gondola for aeromedical studies and first-person observations and photography of the edge of space, 1957–1958.

Notes

References
 

1957 children's books
American picture books
Curious George
Houghton Mifflin books
Fiction about outer space